The 2016 Qatar Total Open was a professional women's tennis tournament played on hard courts. It was the 14th edition of the event and part of the WTA Premier 5 series of the 2016 WTA Tour. It took place at the International Tennis and Squash complex in Doha, Qatar between 21 and 27 February 2016.

Points and prize money

Point distribution

Prize money

* per team

Singles main-draw entrants

Seeds

   1 Rankings as of February 15, 2016.

Other entrants
The following players received wildcards into the singles main draw:
  Fatma Al-Nabhani
  Eugenie Bouchard
  Çağla Büyükakçay

The following players received entry from the qualifying draw:
  Kateryna Bondarenko
  Jana Čepelová
  Kirsten Flipkens
  Ana Konjuh
  Anastasija Sevastova
  Donna Vekić
  Elena Vesnina
  Wang Qiang

Withdrawals
Before the tournament
  Mona Barthel → replaced by  Daria Kasatkina
  Irina-Camelia Begu → replaced by  Misaki Doi
  Alizé Cornet → replaced by  Zheng Saisai
  Camila Giorgi → replaced by  Yaroslava Shvedova
  Peng Shuai (right hand injury) → replaced by  Tsvetana Pironkova
  Maria Sharapova (forearm injury) → replaced by  Bethanie Mattek-Sands
  Serena Williams (flu) → replaced by  Denisa Allertová

Retirements
  Andrea Petkovic (left thigh injury)

Doubles main-draw entrants

Seeds

1 Rankings as of February 15, 2016.

Other entrants
The following pairs received wildcards into the doubles main draw:
  Fatma Al-Nabhani /  Varvara Lepchenko
  Simona Halep /  Raluca Olaru
  Petra Kvitová /  Barbora Strýcová
  Ons Jabeur /  Olla Mourad

Withdrawals
During the tournament
  Petra Kvitová (right leg injury)

Champions

Singles

  Carla Suárez Navarro def.  Jeļena Ostapenko, 1–6, 6–4, 6–4

Doubles

  Chan Hao-ching /  Chan Yung-jan def.  Sara Errani /  Carla Suárez Navarro, 6–3, 6–3

References

External links
Official Website

Qatar Total Open
Qatar Ladies Open
2016 in Qatari sport